Thomas Andrew Gregorio (born May 5, 1977) is an American former professional baseball catcher, who played in Major League Baseball (MLB) for the Anaheim Angels. He served as the bullpen catcher for the Los Angeles Angels from the latter part of  through the end of the  season.

Gregorio played college baseball at Troy University. He also played eight seasons in the minor league systems of the Oakland Athletics, Seattle Mariners, and Texas Rangers, batting .242/.299/.353. After being released by all three teams in a span of shortly over a year, Gregorio officially retired after the 2006 season. Previously, he was the roving catching coordinator for the Angels.

References

External links

Tom Gregorio Coaching Profile at MLB.com

1977 births
Living people
Anaheim Angels players
Major League Baseball catchers
Boise Hawks players
Cedar Rapids Kernels players
Arkansas Travelers players
Arizona League Angels players
Salt Lake Stingers players
Sacramento River Cats players
Oklahoma RedHawks players
San Antonio Missions players
Major League Baseball bullpen catchers
Troy Trojans baseball players
Los Angeles Angels coaches
Los Angeles Angels of Anaheim coaches
2006 World Baseball Classic players
Baseball players from New York City